
AD 14 (XIV) was a common year starting on Monday (link will display the full calendar) of the Julian calendar. At the time, it was known as the Year of the Consulship of Pompeius and Appuleius (or, less frequently, year 767 Ab urbe condita). The denomination AD 14 for this year has been used since the early medieval period, when the Anno Domini calendar era became the prevalent method in Europe for naming years.

Events

By place

Roman Empire 
 Augustus' third (and final) 20-year census of the Roman Empire reports a total of 4,973,000 citizens.
 August 19 – Augustus, the first Roman emperor, dies and is declared to be a god.
 September 18 – Tiberius succeeds his stepfather Augustus as Roman emperor.
 Legions on the Rhine mutiny after the death of Augustus; Germanicus restores discipline amongst the legions.
 Germanicus is appointed commander of the forces in Germany, beginning a campaign that will end in 16.
 Germanicus leads a brutal raid against the Marsi, a German tribe on the upper Ruhr river, who are massacred.
 The town and port of Nauportus are plundered by a mutinous Roman legion that was sent there to build roads and bridges.
 Sextus Appuleius and Sextus Pompeius serve as Roman consuls.

China 
 First year of tianfeng era of the Chinese Xin Dynasty.
 Famine hits China; some citizens turn to cannibalism.

By topic

Art 
 The Hellenistic period ends, according to some scholars (usual date 31 BC).

Births 
 Lucius Caecilius Iucundus, Roman banker (d. AD 62)
 Marcus Junius Silanus, Roman consul (d. AD 54)

Deaths 
 August 19 – Augustus, Roman emperor (b. 63 BC)
 August 20 – Agrippa Postumus, Augustus (b. 12 BC)
 Gnaeus Pompeius (Rufus), Roman consul
 Julia the Elder, daughter of Augustus (b. 39 BC)
 Lucius Aemilius Paullus, Roman consul
 Parthenius of Nicaea, Greek grammarian
 Paullus Fabius Maximus, Roman consul
 Sempronius Gracchus, Roman nobleman

Notes

 

als:10er#14